Jennifer Percy is an American writer. Her work has been published in The New York Times, Harper's, and The New Republic.

Career 

Jen Percy is a graduate of the Iowa Writers’ Workshop, where she received a Truman Capote Fellowship in fiction. She also received an Iowa Arts Fellowship from Iowa’s Nonfiction Writing Program. Winner of a Pushcart Prize and a grant from the National Endowment for the Arts, her work has appeared in a number of magazines, including Harper’s, The New Republic, and The Oxford American. She has taught writing at New York University and Columbia University.

Percy's first book, Demon Camp: A Soldier's Exorcism, was published in 2014 by Simon and Schuster and was reviewed by the New York Times.

The book focuses on post-traumatic stress disorder and what it means to be haunted by trauma. Percy drew inspiration from a newspaper article the suicide of a man haunted by an Iraqi soldier he’d killed, talking to his ghost every night. She too became almost haunted by bats which were seemingly following her. One morning, she found a cereal bowl with a dead bat in the milk.

Awards and honors 

In 2012, Percy received a grant from the National Endowment for the Arts. In 2013, she won a Pushcart Prize.

In 2017, she won the National Magazine Award for Feature Writing.

In 2020, she was honored with a Dart Center award.

Personal life 

Jen's brother is writer Benjamin Percy.

References

The New York Times people
21st-century American writers
Year of birth missing (living people)
Living people
21st-century American women writers